Farm to Market Road 230 (FM 230) is a farm to market road in Houston, Walker, and Trinity Counties in Texas.

Route description
FM 230 begins at an intersection with FM 1280 in Lovelady, one block from that route's intersection with  SH 19. The road travels to the southwest through unincorporated Houston County before it reaches the Texas Department of Criminal Justice's Eastham Unit, located at the Houston–Walker county line. After passing the prison, FM 230 turns to the east and briefly enters Walker County before crossing into Trinity County. The road then enters Trinity along Main Street, reaching its eastern terminus at SH 19.

As the route was designated as a west–east route, reference markers increase from Lovelady to Trinity. However, the segment from Lovelady to the Eastham Unit is now signed south–north, while the segment from the Eastham Unit to Trinity is signed west–east.

History
FM 230 was designated on June 8, 1945; the original route began at what was then  SH 45 (now SH 19) in Lovelady and traveled  westward. The route was extended  to past Weldon on November 23, 1948 and then  to the Eastham Unit on April 21, 1954. On November 24, 1959, FM 230 was extended east . On September 27, 1960, the road was extended east to the Trinity county line. The eastward extension to Trinity occurred on October 14, 1960, replacing FM 287.

Major intersections

References

0230
Transportation in Houston County, Texas
Transportation in Trinity County, Texas
Transportation in Walker County, Texas